William V, Duke of Jülich ( – 25/26 February 1361) was a German nobleman. Some authors call him William I, because he was the first Duke of Jülich; the earlier Williams had been Count of Jülich. Other authors call the subject of this article "William VI"; they count the son and co-ruler of William IV as William V.

William V was the eldest son of Gerhard V of Jülich and Elisabeth of Brabant-Aarschot, daughter of Godfrey of Brabant.

William V was a key political figure of his time, being a brother-in-law to both Edward III of England and Emperor Ludwig IV.  He spent enormous sums of money to have his brother Walram of Jülich appointed as Archbishop of Cologne over Adolph II of the Marck.  In 1337 he was crucially involved in the German-English alliance which caused the start of the Hundred Years' War.  William was an important supporter of Emperor Ludwig and for a time, he supported the Habsburgs against the House of Luxembourg in the Carinthian war of succession.  Upon the collapse of the German-English alliance and the death of his brother-in-law, William switched his allegiance to Emperor Charles IV.  In 1352 he initiated an inheritance tax on Heinsberg-Valkenburg/Monschau.  William won important positions through his Archbishop brother and also served for a time as a field captain for Flanders in the Hundred Years' War.  His sons fought against him during an uprising of part of the Jülich knighthood which opposed inclusion in the increasing territorial state, and he was imprisoned by them in 1349, but released in 1351 due to public pressure.

Upon his father's death in 1328, William became Count of Jülich.  In 1336 William was appointed Margrave by his brother-in-law, Emperor Ludwig IV, and in 1356–57 he was raised to the level of Duke by Emperor Charles IV, thus becoming the first Duke of Jülich.  His skillful marriage policy, especially the marriage of his son Gerhard to Margaret of Ravensberg, heiress of Berg and Ravensberg, enabled him to add territory to the house of Jülich. Upon William's death in 1361, the Duchy of Jülich passed to his second son, William, his eldest son having predeceased.  William and his wife are buried in Nideggen.

He seems to have held the title of Earl of Cambridge from 1340 to his death.

Family and children
On 26 February 1324 in Cologne, William married Joanna of Hainaut (1311 or 13 – 1374).  They had the following children:

 Gerhard, Count of Berg and Ravensberg (c. 1325 – 1360), had issue
 William, Duke of Jülich (c. 1327 – 1393)
 Richardis, married Engelbert III of the Marck
 Philippa, married Godfrey II of Heinsberg
 Reinold
 Joanna, married William I, Count of Isenburg-Wied
 Elizabeth, married John Plantagenet, 3rd Earl of Kent and Sir Eustache d'Aubrechicourt

References

External links 
 genealogie-mittelalter.de
 Lower Rhine Nobility

1299 births
1361 deaths
Date of birth unknown
Dukes of Jülich
Burials in North Rhine-Westphalia
House of Jülich
Earls of Cambridge
Peers created by Edward III